Adnan Menderes (1899 – 17 September 1961) was a Turkish politician who served as Prime Minister of Turkey between 1950 and 1960. He was one of the founders of the Democrat Party (DP) in 1946, the fourth legal opposition party of Turkey. He was tried and hanged under the military junta after the 1960 coup d'état, along with two other cabinet members, Fatin Rüştü Zorlu and Hasan Polatkan. One of the accusations brought against him was of him ordering the Istanbul pogrom against citizens of Greek ethnicity. He was the last Turkish political leader to be executed after a military coup and is also one of the four political leaders of the Turkish Republic (along with Kemal Atatürk, Süleyman Demirel and Turgut Özal) to have had a mausoleum built in his honour.

Early life and career
Adnan Menderes was born in 1899 in Koçarlı, Aydın Province, as a son of a wealthy landowner of Crimean Tatar origin. After primary school, Menderes attended the American College in İzmir. He fought against the invading Greek army during the Turkish War of Independence and was awarded a medal of honour. In the summer of 1919, a çete section under Adnan tortured and murdered a group of 31 Greek boy scouts in the region of Aydın. He graduated from the Law School of Ankara University. In 1930, Menderes organized a branch of the short-lived Liberal Republican Party (Serbest Cumhuriyet Fırkası) in Aydın. After the party dissolved itself, he was invited by Atatürk himself to join the ruling Republican People's Party and was selected by the party leaders as a deputy of Aydın in 1931. In 1945, he was expelled from the party with two other colleagues due to inner-party opposition to the nationalization policies of İsmet İnönü.

Rise to power 

In June 1945, Menderes, together with Celâl Bayar, Fuat Köprülü and Refik Koraltan demanded more political and democratic freedom in their Motion with four signatures. The motion was not approved by any member of the Turkish parliament except for the four who brought the motion to parliament, and by September 1945, Menderes, Köprülü and Koraltan were all stripped of their membership of the CHP due to their opposition to the Turkish government. Bayar then resigned from parliament and later also the party. On 7 January 1946, the four formed the Democratic Party (DP) and in the 1946 elections Menderes was elected deputy of the Democratic Party representing Kütahya. When the DP won 52% of the votes in the first free elections in Turkish history on 14 May 1950 (in which votes were cast in secret and counted openly), Menderes became prime minister, and in 1955 he also assumed the duties of foreign minister. He later won two more free elections, one in 1954 and the other in 1957.

During the 10 years of his term as prime minister, the Turkish economy was growing at a rate of 9% per annum. He supported an eventual Military alliance with the Western Bloc and during his tenure, Turkey was admitted to the NATO in 1952. With the economic support of the United States via the Marshall Plan, agriculture was mechanized; and transport, energy, education, health care, insurance and banking progressed.

Other historical accounts highlight the economic crisis in the mid-1950s, during Menderes's term, which saw Turkey's economy contract (with an 11% GDP/capita decrease in 1954), as one of the reasons for the government's orchestration of the Istanbul pogrom against the Greek ethnic minority (see below).

Istanbul pogrom

In 1955, the Menderes government is believed to have orchestrated the Istanbul pogrom, which targeted the city's substantial Greek ethnic minority. In September 1955 a bomb exploded close to the Turkish consulate in Greece's second-largest city, Thessaloniki, also damaging the Atatürk Museum, site of Atatürk's birthplace. The damage to the house was minimal, with some broken windows. In retaliation, in Istanbul thousands of shops, houses, churches and even graves belonging to members of the ethnic Greek minority were destroyed within a few hours, over a dozen people were killed and many more injured.

The ongoing struggle between Turkey and Greece over control of Cyprus, and Cypriot intercommunal violence, formed part of the backdrop to the pogrom. The United Kingdom invited Turkey and Greece to a conference in London, which started on 26 August 1955. The day before the Tripartite London Conference (29 August – 7 September 1955) began, Menderes claimed that Greek Cypriots were planning a massacre of Turkish Cypriots. Seeing the opportunity to extricate Britain, Prime Minister Anthony Eden advised the Turkish delegates that they should be stern. Foreign Minister Fatin Rüştü Zorlu paid heed to Eden and launched a harsh opening salvo, stating that Turkey would reconsider its commitment to the Treaty of Lausanne unless Greece reconsidered its position on Cyprus. The Greek delegates, surprised by the harshness of the speech, blamed the British.

Deflecting domestic attention to Cyprus was politically convenient for the Menderes government, which was suffering from an ailing economy. Although a minority, the Greek population played a prominent role in the city's business life, making it a convenient scapegoat during the economic crisis in the mid-1950s. The DP responded first with inflationary policies, then when that failed, with authoritarianism and populism. DP's policies also introduced rural-urban mobility, which exposed some of the rural population to the lifestyles of the urban minorities. The three chief destinations were the largest three cities: Istanbul, Ankara, and Izmir. Between 1945 and 1955, the population of Istanbul increased from 1 million to about 1.6 million. Many of these new residents found themselves in shanty towns, and constituted a prime target for populist policies.

Finally, the conference fell apart on 6 September, the first day the subject of Cyprus would be broached at the conference, when news broke of the bombing in Thessaloniki.

The 1961 Yassıada trials after the 1960 coup d'état accused Menderes and Foreign Minister Fatin Rüştü Zorlu of planning the riots, finding that the supposed assault was in fact a provocation organised by the Menderes government, which planted the bomb in Thessaloniki and also bussed infuriated villagers from Anatolia into Istanbul with the aim of "punishing" Greeks. Menderes subsequently apologized and offered compensation to those affected.

Plane crash survival

On 17 February 1959, the Turkish Airlines aircraft Vickers Viscount Type 793, registration TC-SEV, carrying Adnan Menderes and a party of government officials on a flight from Istanbul to London Gatwick Airport crashed a few miles short of the runway, near Rusper, Sussex, in heavy fog and caught fire. Nine of the sixteen passengers and five of the eight crew lost their lives. Menderes, sitting in the back part of the plane, survived the accident almost uninjured and was hospitalized at the London Clinic 90 minutes after receiving first aid from Margaret Bailey, a local resident who rushed to the crash site.

He was on his way to sign the London Agreements on the Cyprus issue with British Prime Minister Harold Macmillan and Greek Prime Minister Constantine Karamanlis, which gave the three sides the right to intervene in Cyprus in case peace is broken by any of the parties.

Menderes signed the London Agreement on 19 February 1959 in the hospital. He returned home on 26 February 1959 and was welcomed by even his arch-rival İsmet İnönü and a large crowd.

Political style and beliefs

Menderes became quite famous for selling or distributing most of the estate he had inherited to small shareholders. He was more tolerant towards traditional lifestyles and different forms of practice of Islam than Atatürk and his party had been – he campaigned in the 1950 elections on the platform of legalizing the Arabic Islamic call to prayer (adhan), which had been banned in order to wean Turkey from Arabic influences. He re-opened thousands of mosques across the country which had been closed down, and as such, he was blamed by his political opponents for using religion as a tool for political gain. One of his first political moves was to exclude the pictures of İsmet İnönü on Turkish banknotes and stamps and instead put Atatürk pictures back, which were taken off when Inönü became president in 1938. Thanks to the public support and the legacy of Atatürk, it was a successful move, even if the Turkish law under the former president stated that the image of the president of the country would be placed on the banknotes (in this case Celal Bayar). In one of his speeches, he said that members of parliament could bring back the caliphate if they so desired.

While remaining pro-Western, he was more active than his predecessors in building relations with Muslim states. Menderes had a more liberal economic policy than earlier prime ministers, and allowed more private enterprise. In general, his economic policies of high agricultural spending, especially in infrastructure meant that the peasants of Turkey appreciated his premiership.

He was most intolerant towards criticism, so he instituted press censorship and had journalists arrested, as well as attempting to oppress the opposing political parties and take institutions such as universities under his control. Menderes who was well liked by the people in general and also had the support of the Army Chief of Staff General Cemal Gürsel who, in a personal patriotic memorandum, had advocated that Menderes should become the president of the republic to secure the national unity, became increasingly unpopular among the intellectuals, university students and a group of radical young officers in the military, who feared that the ideals of Atatürk were in danger.

The most important event that brought his fall from power was probably the establishment of Commission of Inquiries (Tahkikat Komisyonu). The commission, composed only of Democratic Party MPs and bestowed those MPs with the powers of public and military prosecutors along with the right to give a verdict. This was against the principle of separation of powers and gave the MPs the power to both prosecute and judge. Furthermore, the commission's verdicts could not be taken to the appeal courts.

Coup, trial, and execution
A military coup on 27 May 1960, organized by 37 "young officers", deposed the government, and Menderes was arrested along with Bayar and all the leading party members. They were charged with violating the constitution, ordering the Istanbul pogrom, in which 57 Greeks were killed, and embezzling money from state funds.

Menderes and other leading figures of the DP were put on trial by a military court on the island of Yassıada (see Yassıada trials). Along with Bayar and two former cabinet ministers, Menderes was sentenced to death. He delayed his execution with a suicide attempt by taking an overdose of sleeping pills. Despite pleas for forgiveness by Head of State Cemal Gürsel and even from İsmet İnönü (in addition to similar pleas from several world leaders, including John F. Kennedy and Queen Elizabeth II), Menderes was executed by the junta at the gallows on the island of İmralı on 17 September 1961. The sentence of ex-President Bayar was commuted to imprisonment.

Two months later, İsmet İnönü formed a new government under military tutelage, in coalition and with the help of the newly emerging Justice Party (in Turkish: Adalet Partisi), after these two major parties among themselves took the majority of the votes in 1961 elections. Adalet Partisi, the successor of the heritage of Menderes, would win victories in later elections especially under the leadership of Süleyman Demirel.

Legacy 
On 17 September 1990, the 29th anniversary of Menderes' execution, he was posthumously pardoned by the Turkish Parliament and his grave was moved to a mausoleum named after him in Istanbul.  Fatin Rüştü Zorlu and Hasan Polatkan, who were the foreign affairs minister and finance minister, respectively in the last Menderes administration, and who were hanged with Menderes by the junta in 1961, were also posthumously cleared of any misconduct. Adnan Menderes University in Aydın and Adnan Menderes Airport in İzmir are named after him. Two high schools, Istanbul Bahcelievler Adnan Menderes Anadolu Lisesi and Aydın Adnan Menderes Anadolu Lisesi, also adopted his name. There are numerous city districts, boulevards and streets named after him by city councils in cities large and small, all across Turkey.

In 2006, Mehmet Feyyat, attorney general of Istanbul at the time, suggested that "İsmet İnönü and Cemal Gürsel placed phone calls to the prison's administration for Menderes' execution to be halted but the Communications Office of the junta cut the lines off".

In March 2023, a monument to Adnan Menderes was unveiled at the Akhmet Yassawi International Kazakh-Turkish University in Turkestan.

Film and television
 The last period of Menderes' life beginning with his 1959 aircraft crash survival until his execution was depicted in the television series Hatırla Sevgili ("") as background events.
 The period when Menderes was prime minister from 1950 to 1960 were depicted in the television series Ben Onu Çok Sevdim (""). Series which began broadcasting at Turkish national broadcaster ATV from September 2013 also focuses on the romance between Menderes and Turkish opera singer Ayhan Aydan. He was played by actor Mehmet Aslantuğ

See also
Adnan Menderes University
Adnan Menderes Airport

Notes and references

Cemal Gürsel supported him and wanted him to become the Republic's president

External links

Adnan Menderes Turkish Biography 
"Adnan Menderes". Time

 
1899 births
1961 deaths
20th-century prime ministers of Turkey
People from Koçarlı
Ankara University Faculty of Law alumni
Deputies of Kütahya
Deputies of Istanbul
Liberal Republican Party (Turkey) politicians
Republican People's Party (Turkey) politicians
Democrat Party (Turkey, 1946–1961) politicians
Ministers of Foreign Affairs of Turkey
Government ministers of Turkey
Prime Ministers of Turkey
Turkish people of Crimean Tatar descent
Ministers of National Defence of Turkey
Turkish referees and umpires
Leaders ousted by a coup
Executed prime ministers
Filmed executions
20th-century executions by Turkey
Survivors of aviation accidents or incidents
Executed Turkish people
People executed by Turkey by hanging
People who have received posthumous pardons
Members of the 19th government of Turkey
Members of the 20th government of Turkey
Members of the 21st government of Turkey
Members of the 22nd government of Turkey
Members of the 23rd government of Turkey
Turkish politicians convicted of crimes
Politicians arrested in Turkey
Heads of government who were later imprisoned
Centre-right politics in Turkey
Istanbul pogrom